Rafael Redwitz (born 12 August 1980) is a Brazilian–French volleyball coach and former player. He's had obtained French citizenship in 1992, and was a member of the France national team. He currently serves as head coach for Nice VB.

Honours

Clubs
 National championships
 2005/2006  French Championship, with Paris Volley
 2006/2007  French SuperCup, with Paris Volley
 2006/2007  French Championship, with Paris Volley
 2007/2008  French Championship, with Paris Volley
 2010/2011  French Cup, with Tours VB
 2011/2012  French Championship, with Tours VB
 2018/2019  German Cup, with VfB Friedrichshafen

Individual awards
 2010: Polish Cup – Best Setter
 2012: French Championship – Best Setter

External links

 
 Rafael Redwitz at Volleybox.net

References

1980 births
Living people
Sportspeople from Curitiba
Brazilian men's volleyball players
French men's volleyball players
French volleyball coaches
Brazilian expatriate sportspeople in Andorra
Brazilian expatriate sportspeople in France
Expatriate volleyball players in France
Brazilian expatriate sportspeople in Italy
Expatriate volleyball players in Italy
Brazilian expatriate sportspeople in Poland
Expatriate volleyball players in Poland
Brazilian expatriate sportspeople in Russia
Expatriate volleyball players in Russia
Brazilian expatriate sportspeople in Germany
Expatriate volleyball players in Germany
Resovia (volleyball) players
AZS Częstochowa players
Setters (volleyball)